Solaster is a genus of sea stars in the family Solasteridae.

Species

The following species are listed in the World Register of Marine Species:

References

 
Asteroidea genera
Taxa named by Edward Forbes